Le Huynh Chau (Vietnamese: Lê Huỳnh Châu; born 13 November 1987; living in Ho Chi Minh City) is a male Vietnamese Taekwondo practitioner who competed at the 2012 Summer Olympics in the -58 kg class.  He is one of the greatest medalists of Vietnam's Taekwondo.

References

External links
 
 
 

1987 births
Living people
Vietnamese male taekwondo practitioners
Olympic taekwondo practitioners of Vietnam
Taekwondo practitioners at the 2012 Summer Olympics
Taekwondo practitioners at the 2006 Asian Games
Taekwondo practitioners at the 2010 Asian Games
Taekwondo practitioners at the 2014 Asian Games
Sportspeople from Ho Chi Minh City
Southeast Asian Games gold medalists for Vietnam
Southeast Asian Games silver medalists for Vietnam
Southeast Asian Games bronze medalists for Vietnam
Southeast Asian Games medalists in taekwondo
Competitors at the 2007 Southeast Asian Games
Competitors at the 2009 Southeast Asian Games
Competitors at the 2013 Southeast Asian Games
Asian Games competitors for Vietnam
World Taekwondo Championships medalists
Asian Taekwondo Championships medalists
21st-century Vietnamese people